Autodromo di Mores is a permanent motor racing and motorbike race track on the Italian island of Sardinia. Building first started on the circuit on 15 July, 2000 and was completed on 15 March, 2003. The circuit hosts the Prove Libere Motociclistiche, Sardegna VaCanze, BMW Academy, Gully Racing and Sardegna Motori. The circuit is located mid-way between the two ports and airports in northern Sardinia, Olbia, Porto Torres and Alghero Fertilia.

The Franco di Suni National Raceway, also known as Circuit of Mores or Sardinian Raceway, is the first and only track of its kind on the island. It can accommodate race car and motorcycle events, in accordance with the technical standards and Sports issued federations guarantors of the various disciplines. Namely, the FIA, the CSAI and the IMF.

Notes and references

External links
Autodromo di Mores English-language homepage

Motorsport venues in Italy
Buildings and structures in the Province of Sassari
Sports venues in Sardinia